Erich Schaeder (22 December 1861 – 18 February 1936) was a German Protestant theologian.

He studied theology at the universities of Berlin and Greifswald, where in 1891 he qualified as a lecturer. In 1894 he became an associate professor of theology at the University of Königsberg, and later on, served as a full professor at the universities of Kiel (from 1899) and Breslau (from 1918).

Schaeder was a leading advocate of theocentric theology. Through his criticism of 19th-century theological anthropocentrism, he was one of the founders of dialectical theology.

Selected works 
 Die Bedeutung des lebendigen Christus fur die Rechtfertigung nach Paulus, 1891 – The importance of the living Christ for justification to Paul the Apostle.
 Die Christologie der Bekenntnisse und die moderne Theologie : zwei Vorträge (with Adolf Schlatter; 1905) – The Christology of confessions and modern theology: two lectures.
 Das Evangelium Jesu und das Evangelium von Jesus, 1906 – Jesus the Evangelist and the Gospel of Jesus.
 Der Moderne Mensch und die Kirche, 1907 – Modern man and the church.
 Natur und Christentum : vier Vorträge (with Karl Bornhäuser, Wilhelm Lütgert and Georg Lasson; 1907) – Nature and Christianity: four lectures.
 Schriftglaube und Heilsgewissheit : Vorlesungen, 1908 – Scripture faith and assurance of salvation: lectures.
 Theologie und geschichte, 1909 – Theology and history.
 Theozentrische Theologie : eine Untersuchung zur dogmatische Prinzipienlehre (2 volumes, 1909–14) –  Theocentric theology: an investigation into the dogmatic doctrine of principles.

References 

1861 births
1936 deaths
People from Goslar (district)
University of Greifswald alumni
Humboldt University of Berlin alumni
Academic staff of the University of Kiel
Academic staff of the University of Breslau
Academic staff of the University of Königsberg
19th-century German Protestant theologians
20th-century German Protestant theologians